The Clara F. Bacon House is located in Lodi, Wisconsin. It was added to the National Register of Historic Places in 2009.

History
The house was built in the Queen Anne architecture style in 1899. It belonged to Clara F. Bacon, who moved to Lodi from Baraboo, Wisconsin after her husband's death.

References

Houses on the National Register of Historic Places in Wisconsin
Houses in Columbia County, Wisconsin
Queen Anne architecture in Wisconsin
Houses completed in 1899
Lodi, Wisconsin
National Register of Historic Places in Columbia County, Wisconsin